The Colliers and Salters (Scotland) Act 1775 is an Act of the Parliament of Great Britain (15 Geo III c. 28) which changed the working conditions of miners in Scotland.

Background
A 1606 Act "Anent Coilyearis and Saltaris" had placed Scottish "coalyers, coal-bearers and salters" in a condition of permanent bondage to their employer. Any such worker who absented from that employer and sought to work elsewhere was to be punished as a thief. The Act also included provision whereby vagabonds could be placed unwillingly into the same compulsory labour.

Erskine May notes that these workers were thereafter treated "a distinct class, not entitled to the same liberties as their fellow-subjects".

The 1775 Act noted that the Scottish coal workers existed in "a state of slavery or bondage" and sought to address this. The main focus of the legislation was to remove the condition of servitude on new entrants to these industries, thus opening them to greater expansion. Although the Act noted "the reproach of allowing such a State of Servitude to exist in a Free Country", it sought not to do "any injury to the present Masters", so created only gradual conditions whereby those already in servitude in the mines could seek to be liberated from it after a period of seven or ten years depending on age. The Act also included a provision for extending that term by two years if a miner acted in combination with others.

Consequences
As Erskine May noted, "these poor ignorant slaves, generally in debt to their masters, were rarely in a condition to press their claims to freedom" so the later conditions were largely ineffective. It took a further Act, the Colliers (Scotland) Act 1799 (c.56), to liberate the remaining mine workers from the conditions created by the 1606 Act, while also extending provisions against organised labour.

References

External links
 

Great Britain Acts of Parliament 1775
1775 in Scotland
Economic history of Scotland
18th century in Scotland
Mining in Scotland
Acts of the Parliament of Great Britain concerning Scotland
Coal mining law